Kim Seo-Jun (born 24 March 1989) is a South Korean footballer who plays as midfielder for Gyeongju KH&NP in Korea National League.

Career
He was selected by Ulsan Hyundai FC in the 2012 K League draft.

In July 2013, he joined Suwon FC on loan and made 19 appearances and 2 goals. He signed with Suwon FC on a permanent basis in 2014.

References

External links 

1989 births
Living people
Association football midfielders
South Korean footballers
Ulsan Hyundai FC players
Ulsan Hyundai Mipo Dockyard FC players
Suwon FC players
K League 1 players
Korea National League players
K League 2 players